The 1991 Bristol City Council election took place on 2 May 1991 to elect members of Bristol City Council in England. This was on the same day as other local elections. One third of seats were up for election. Two seats were contested in Windmill Hill due to an extra vacancy occurring. There was a general swing against the Conservatives. In Lockleaze, the Labour Party failed to field a candidate because of a nomination papers error.

Ward results

The change is calculated using the results when these actual seats were last contested, i.e. the 1987 election.

Ashley

Bedminster

Bishopsworth

Brislington East

Brislington West

Cabot

Easton

Eastville

Filwood

Frome Vale

Hartcliffe

Hengrove

Hillfields

Knowle

Lawrence Hill

Lockleaze

Southville

St George East

St George West

Stockwood

Whitchurch Park

Windmill Hill

Sources
 Bristol Evening Post 4 May 1991

1991
1991 English local elections
1990s in Bristol